Nesterovo is a rural locality (a village) and the administrative center of Domshinskoye Rural Settlement, Sheksninsky District, Vologda Oblast, Russia. The population was 87 as of 2002.

Geography 
Nesterovo is located 38 km southeast of Sheksna (the district's administrative centre) by road. Mititsyno is the nearest rural locality.

References 

Rural localities in Sheksninsky District